Ludwikowice Kłodzkie  is a village in the administrative district of Gmina Nowa Ruda, within Kłodzko County, Lower Silesian Voivodeship, in south-western Poland.

The village has a population of 2,540.

The oldest known mention of the village comes from 1352, although it certainly existed earlier. Between 1871 and 1945, it was part of Germany. During World War II in 1942, the Germans established a forced labour camp for Jews in the village. In 1944, it was transformed into a subcamp of the Gross-Rosen concentration camp, intended for Jewish women. Of about 600 imprisoned women, up to 300 died.

There is a historic Church of St. Michael the Archangel and a museum in the village.

Gallery

References

External links 
Unofficial web site about Ludwikowice Kłodzkie
 Jewish Community in Ludwikowice Kłodzkie on Virtual Shtetl

Villages in Kłodzko County